The 1946 Florida A&M Rattlers football team was an American football team that represented Florida A&M College as a member of the Southern Intercollegiate Athletic Conference (SIAC) during the 1946 college football season. In their second season under head coach Jake Gaither, the Rattlers compiled a 6–3–1 record (6–0 against SIAC opponents), and won the SIAC championship, and appeared in two post-season games, losing to Lincoln (PA) in the Orange Blossom Classic and tying Wiley in the Angel Bowl.

The Dickinson System rated Florida A&M as the No. 8 black college football team for 1946.

Florida A&M end Nathaniel "Traz" Powell was selected as a first-team player on The Pittsburgh Courier's 1946 All-America team. Three others were named to the second team: end Mitchell; tackle Brewington; and back Theodore "Ted" Montgomery. The team's quarterback was "Big Jim" Williams.
 
The Rattlers played their home games at Sampson-Bragg Field in Tallahassee, Florida.

Schedule

References

Florida AandM
Florida A&M Rattlers football seasons
Florida AandM Rattlers football